Moti Taka (born on March 1, 1997) is an Israeli singer of Mizrahi music.

Early life
Taka was born in Kiryat Bialik to a large Ethiopian Jewish family. His family originally immigrated from Ethiopia in 1989.
 Prior to singing, he worked at a falafel stand.

Career
Taka released his first song Tagid Li in 2013. His big breakout came in 2017 after the release of the single Balbale which received over 12 million views on Youtube. He was chosen as Breakout of the Year for 2017 by the Israeli Annual Hebrew Song Chart. In 2018 he released the song Tukur which was the official song for the Israeli Pride Parade in 2018. His first album titled Balbale was released in 2018.

References

External links
 Facebook
 YouTube

21st-century Israeli male singers
1997 births
Living people
People from Kiryat Bialik
Israeli people of Ethiopian-Jewish descent

Mizrahi singers